Overton Phillips (20 September 1908 Ottumwa, Iowa – 1 April 1999 Santa Barbara, California) was an American racecar driver. His nickname was Bunny.  He was an authority on Bugatti cars.

Biography
He was born on September 20, 1908 in Ottumwa, Iowa.

In the trials for the 1937 Indianapolis 500 his car burst into flames when a crank shaft broke and punctured his gas tank. He crashed into the pit stop killing George Warford. Otto Rohde died of his injuries on June 1. He died on April 1, 1999 in Santa Barbara, California.

Indy 500 results

References

1908 births
1999 deaths
American racing drivers
Indianapolis 500 drivers
Sportspeople from Beverly Hills, California
Racing drivers from California